Hassan Mawanda Wasswa (born 14 February 1988) is a Ugandan professional footballer who plays for Saudi Arabian club Jeddah and the Uganda national team.

Club career
On 4 January 2017, Wasswa moved to Lebanese Premier League club Nejmeh. However, due to injury problems, he did not feature for the club. In August 2019, Wasswa joined Saudi Arabian club Jeddah Club.

Career statistics

International

Honours
Saint George S.C.
 Ethiopian Premier League: 2007–08

Karabükspor
 TFF First League: 2009–10

References

1988 births
Living people
Association football midfielders
Ugandan footballers
Uganda international footballers
Ugandan expatriate footballers
Expatriate soccer players in South Africa
Expatriate footballers in Ethiopia
Expatriate footballers in Turkey
Expatriate footballers in Iraq
Expatriate footballers in Lebanon
Expatriate footballers in Saudi Arabia
Kampala Capital City Authority FC players
Saint George S.C. players
F.C. Cape Town players
Kardemir Karabükspor footballers
Altay S.K. footballers
Kayserispor footballers
Kayseri Erciyesspor footballers
Dong Nai FC players
SC Villa players
Al-Shorta SC players
Nejmeh SC players
Tala'ea El Gaish SC players
Jeddah Club players
Saudi First Division League players
2017 Africa Cup of Nations players
2019 Africa Cup of Nations players
Ugandan expatriate sportspeople in South Africa
Ugandan expatriate sportspeople in Ethiopia
Ugandan expatriate sportspeople in Turkey
Ugandan expatriate sportspeople in Iraq
Ugandan expatriate sportspeople in Lebanon
Uganda A' international footballers
2014 African Nations Championship players
2016 African Nations Championship players